Aberdeen, Indiana may refer to:

 Aberdeen, Ohio County, Indiana, an unincorporated community in Ohio County
 Aberdeen, Porter County, Indiana, a census-designated place in Porter County

See also 
 Aberdeen (disambiguation)